This is a list of mayors of the city of Bern, Switzerland. The executive of Bern is the municipal council (Gemeinderat). It is chaired by the mayor (Stadtpräsident von Bern). From 1832 to 1871, the term Gemeindepräsident was used.
Before 1832, the title of the mayor of Bern was Schultheiss.

For earlier mayors, see List of Schultheiss of Bern

See also
 Timeline of Bern

Gallery 

Bern, Switzerland
Mayors of Bern, list
 
History of Bern
Lists of mayors (complete 1900-2013)